Zelyony (alternatively Zelyoniy or Zelyonyy) may refer to:

 Zelyony (surname)
 Zelyony, Bashkortostan, a village in Bashkortostan, Russia
 Zelyony Island (Rostov-on-Don), an island in the Don near Rostov-on-Don, Russia
 Zelyony Island (Kuril Islands), an island in the Kuril Island chain

See also
Zeleny

ru:Зелёный (значения)